This is the list the notable  academics and alumni of Makerere University, the oldest university in Uganda. It is limited to those with articles in Wikipedia.

A 
 Eric Adriko
 Thomas Aisu
 Rubby Opio Aweri
 Abigaba Cuthbert Mirembe

B 
 Venansius Baryamureeba
 Noble Banadda
 Waswa Balunywa
 Gilbert Bukenya
 Pauline Byakika
 Abed Bwanika
 William Bazeyo

C 
 William Canby
 Colin Chapman (primatologist)
 David Cook (literary critic)

D 
 Paul D'Arbela
 Hugh Dinwiddy

E 
 Les Ebdon
 Moses Ebuk
 Eric Berry Edney

F 
 Oliver Furley

G 
 Arthur Gakwandi

H 
 Denis Hills

I 
 Charles Ibingira
 Richard Idro
 Robert Ikoja-Odongo

K 
 Charles Kabugo
 Werikhe Kafabusa
 Mondo Kagonyera
 Senteza Kajubi
 James Katorobo
 Maggie Kigozi
 Richard Kanyerezi
 Lawrence Kazibwe
 Nehemiah Katusiime
 Sarah Kiguli
 Elly Katunguka

L 
 Peter Lwabi

M 
 Kiddu Makubuya
 Philemon Mateke
 Ali Mazrui
 Florence Muranga
 Joseph Mugisha
 Maud Kamatenesi Mugisha

N 
 Evelyn Nabunya
 Jolly Nankunda
 Stella Nyanzi
 Augustus Nuwagaba
 Apolo Nsibambi
 Barnabas Nawangwe

O 
 Wafula Oguttu
 Benjamin Josses Odoki
 Celestino Obua
 Ponsiano Ocama
 Charles Olweny
 Mark Ouma
 Denis Owen
 Raphael Owor
 Jackson Orem
 Anne Atai Omoruto

P 
 Okot p'Bitek

R 
 John Ruganda

S 
 Samuel Sejjaaka
 Hakim Sendagire
 David Serwadda

T 
 Hilda Tadria
 Justinian Tamusuza
 Sylvia Tamale

W 
 Rhoda Wanyenze
 Denis Williams
 John Walugembe
 Timothy Wangusa
 Fred Wabwire-Mangen

References

See also

 
Makerere